Civilian is the debut album by Boy Kill Boy. It was released on 22 May 2006 and reached number 16 in the UK Album Chart.

Background and production
Vocalist and guitarist Chris Peck spent three years playing in a post-Britpop band with his schoolfriend drummer Shaz Mahmood. After a few months of downtime, the pair formed Boy Kill Boy in 2004. The band, now with the addition of keyboardist Pete Carr, added bassist Kevin Chase to the line-up after meeting him at a house party. A month afterwards, the band were due to support another band in London; however, the show was cancelled, and was followed-up by another support slot, this time for Hard-Fi, the week after. "Suzie", backed with "Last of the Great", was released as a single on 16 May 2005, through Fierce Panda Records. Shortly after this, the band signed to Mercury Records, and toured throughout the rest of the year. "Civil Sin" was released as a single on 19 September 2005. Civilian was recorded Sawmills Studios with producer John Cornfield, who later mixed the recordings at Landsdowne Recording Studios.

Composition
Musically, the sound of Civilian has been described as dance-punk, indie rock, and synth-rock, with influences from new wave, drawing comparison to the Killers, and Interpol. The opening punk rock track, "Back Again", sets the pace of the album, with an up-tempo guitar riff and synthesizers, and is followed by the synth-pop song "On and On". "Suzie" recalled "Seaside" (2004) by the Ordinary Boys, and is followed by the indie pop song "Six Minutes". "Ivy Parker" is a ballad that was reminiscent of "All These Things That I've Done" (2004) by the Killers. The Smiths-indebted "Civil Sin" has a chorus section in the style of Good Mourning (2003)-era Alkaline Trio, and the goth punk of My Chemical Romance. "Friday – Friday" details violence in a small town, and features a pseudo-ska drum pattern. "Shoot Me Down" is a ballad with a sparse arrangement, done in the vein of Morrissey and Simple Minds; the album ends with the folk-esque "Exit".

Release
"Back Again" was released as a single on 13 February 2006; the CD version included "Cheaper". Two versions were released on vinyl: The first included "Number One", while the second featured "In Disgrace". In March 2006, the band performed at the entertainment conference South by Southwest in the United States. Civilian was released on 22 May 2006. "Suzie" was released as a single on 17 July 2006. Two versions were released on CD: The first featured "It's Different for Girls" as an extra track, while the second featured "Orphan" and a live version of "Six Minutes" as extra tracks. The vinyl version included "Last of the Great"; in Europe, "Suzie" was released as the EP Suzie EP, which also featured "It's Different for Girls", "Last of the Great", the Fallout recording of "Civil Sin", and the Fierce Panda version of "Suzie".

Civilian was released in the US in on 25 July 2006. "Civil Sin" was released as a single on 31 July 2006. Two versions were released on CD: The first included "Look Away", while the other featured "See Saw" and "Catch". In August 2006, they appeared at the Lollapalooza festival. "Shoot Me Down" was released as a single on 6 November 2006; the CD version included a live version of "Maneater". Two versions were released on vinyl: The first included "Repair", while the other featured "Dukes of John Moon".

Reception

Civilian was met with mixed reviews from music critics.

Track listing
All songs written by Boy Kill Boy.

"Back Again" – 3:06
"On and On" – 3:48
"Suzie" – 3:19
"Six Minutes" – 4:17
"On My Own" – 3:26
"Ivy Parker" – 4:12
"Civil Sin" – 3:55
"Killer" – 3:11
"Friday – Friday" – 2:03
"Showdown" – 3:36
"Shoot Me Down" – 10:16 (includes hidden track "Exit", which starts at 5:37)

Personnel
Personnel per booklet.

Boy Kill Boy
 Chris Pack – vocals, guitar
 Kevin Chase – bass
 Peter Carr – keyboards
 Shaz Mahmood – drums

Production and design
 John Cornfield – producer, mixing
 Big Active – art direction
 Markus Karlsson – design
 Carina Jirsch – band photo

References

2006 albums
Boy Kill Boy albums
Albums produced by John Cornfield
Vertigo Records albums